The following is a list of banana cultivars and the groups into which they are classified. Almost all modern cultivated varieties (cultivars) of edible bananas and plantains are hybrids and polyploids of two wild, seeded banana species, Musa acuminata and Musa balbisiana. Cultivated bananas are almost always seedless (parthenocarpic) and hence sterile, so they are propagated vegetatively (cloned). They are classified into groups according to a genome-based system introduced by Ernest Cheesman, Norman Simmonds, and Ken Shepherd, which indicates the degree of genetic inheritance from the two wild parents and the number of chromosomes (ploidy). Cultivars derived from Musa acuminata are more likely to be used as dessert bananas, while those derived from Musa balbisiana and hybrids of the two are usually plantains or cooking bananas.

Classification of cultivars
Banana plants were originally classified by Linnaeus into two species, which he called Musa paradisiaca – those used as cooking bananas (plantains), and M. sapientum – those used as dessert bananas. The primary center of diversity of cultivated bananas is Southeast Asia. Botanical exploration of this area led to many more species being named, along with subspecies and varieties. However, this approach proved inadequate to deal with the large number of cultivated varieties (cultivars) which were discovered, and many of the names later proved to be synonyms. Furthermore, it was discovered that most cultivated bananas are actually hybrids between two wild species, M. acuminata and M. balbisiana, both first described in 1820 by the Italian botanist Luigi Aloysius Colla, and that Linnaeus' two "species" were both this hybrid, which is now called M. × paradisiaca. Unlike the wild species, which have seeds, cultivated bananas are almost always seedless (parthenocarpic) and hence sterile, so they have to be propagated vegetatively.

In 1955, researchers Norman Simmonds and Ken Shepherd proposed abandoning traditional Latin-based botanical names for cultivated bananas. This approach foreshadowed the International Code of Nomenclature for Cultivated Plants which, in addition to using Latin names based on the International Code of Nomenclature for algae, fungi, and plants, gives cultivars names in a currently spoken language, enclosed in single quotes, and organizes them into "cultivar groups", also not given Latin names.

Banana cultivars derived from M. acuminata and M. balbisiana can be classified into cultivar groups using two criteria. The first is the number of chromosomes: whether the plant is diploid, triploid or tetraploid. The second is relationship to the two ancestral species, which may be determined by genetic analysis or by a scoring system devised by Simmonds and Shepherd. A cultivar is scored on 15 characters, chosen because they differ between the two species. Each character is given a score between one and five according to whether it is typical of M. acuminata or of M. babisiana or is in between. Thus the total score for a cultivar will range from 15 if all characters agree with M. acuminata to 75 if all characters agree with M. balbisiana. Intermediate scores suggest mixed ancestry: for example, 45 would be expected for diploids with equal genetic contributions from both species.

Groups are then named using a combination of the letters "A" and "B". The number of letters shows the ploidy; the proportion of As and Bs the contributions of the ancestral species. The AAB Group, for example, comprises triploid cultivars with more genetic inheritance from M. acuminata than M. balbisiana. A character score of around 35 is expected for members of this group. Within groups, cultivars may be divided into subgroups and then given a cultivar name, e.g. Musa AAA Group (Cavendish Subgroup) 'Robusta'.

In practice, the scoring system and the associated grouping is not as straightforward as the Simmonds and Shepherd naming system implies. For example, a member of the AAB Group should have a score about one third of the way between M. acuminata and M. balbisiana (i.e. about 35) if one third of its chromosomes come from M. balbisiana. However, the cultivars 'Silk' and 'Pome', both classified in the AAB Group, scored 26 and 46 respectively. The cultivar 'Pelipita' is placed in the ABB group, so should have 11 of its 33 chromosomes derived from M. acuminata. However, a technique called "genomic in situ hybridization" (GISH) showed that actually only 8 chromosomes were of this origin. Other lines of evidence suggest a more complex genome structure is present in other banana cultivars, so the group names should not be taken at face value.

Cultivars
The total number of cultivars of bananas and plantains have been estimated to be anything from around 300 to more than 1000. Names are highly confused, even within a single country. Many common names do not refer to a single cultivar or clone; for example 'Lady's Finger' or 'Lady Finger' has been used as the name for members of different genome groups, including AA and AAB. Many other names are synonyms of cultivars grown in the same or different countries. Attempts have been made to create lists of synonyms. In 2000, Valmayor et al. listed equivalent local names for 68 cultivars across five Southeast Asian countries (the Philippines, Malaysia, Indonesia, Thailand and Vietnam), together with their internationally used names. They considered a further 81 cultivars to be unique to one country. In 2007, Ploetz et al. listed more cultivar names and synonyms, with an emphasis on those grown in the islands of the Pacific, but including some grown in areas such as India, Africa and South America. As an example, for the widely grown cultivar 'Dwarf Cavendish', they gave 58 synonyms from 29 countries or geographical areas. ProMusa has created a checklist of banana cultivar names based on available literature.

A recent development is the use of "somaclones" in banana cultivation. Micropropagation involves growing plants from very small amounts of source tissue, sometimes even a single cell, under sterile conditions using artificial techniques to induce growth from mitochondrial relief systems. The purpose of micropropagation is often to produce a large number of genetically identical offspring in the manner of Shannon et al. However, by inducing mutations through various means, it is possible to produce plants which differ slightly from the "parent" plant and from each other ("somaclonal variations"). By growing on these somaclones and selecting those with desirable features, new cultivars can be produced which are very similar to an existing cultivar, but differ in one or two features, such as disease resistance. Somaclones may only be distinguishable by genetic analysis.

Musa section
Musa × paradisiaca is the name for hybrids between Musa acuminata (A) and Musa balbisiana (B), both in Musa section Musa.

AA Group

Diploid Musa acuminata, both wild banana plants and cultivars

Chingan banana
Lacatan banana
Lady Finger banana (Sugar banana)
Pisang jari buaya (Crocodile fingers banana)
Señorita banana (Monkoy, Arnibal banana, Cuarenta dias, Cariñosa, Pisang Empat Puluh Hari, Pisang Lampung)
Sinwobogi banana
Pisang Lilin
Pisang Muli
Pisang Kapas

AAA Group
Triploid Musa acuminata, both wild banana plants and cultivars

Cavendish Subgroup
'Dwarf Cavendish'
'Giant Cavendish' ('Williams')
Formosana (GCTCV-218), a variant with some resistance to Fusarium wilt TR4
'Grand Nain' ('Chiquita')
'Masak Hijau'
'Robusta'
Azman (grown in Turkey)
'Red Dacca'
Dwarf Red banana
Flhorban 920
Gros Michel banana
East African Highland bananas (AAA-EA subgroup)
Pisang Susu ('Kluai Nam Nom')
Pisang Ampyang
Pisang Palembang

AAAA Group
Tetraploid Musa acuminata, both wild bananas and cultivars

Bodles Altafort banana
Golden Beauty banana

AAAB Group

Tetraploid cultivars of Musa × paradisiaca

Atan banana
Goldfinger banana

AAB Group

Triploid cultivars of Musa × paradisiaca. This group contains the Plantain subgroup, composed of "true" plantains or African Plantains. The AAB Group's centre of diversity is Central and West Africa, where a large number of cultivars were domesticated following the introduction of ancestral Plantains from Asia, possibly 2000–3000 years ago.

The Iholena and Maoli-Popo'ulu subgroups are referred to as Pacific plantains.

Iholena subgroup - subgroup of cooking bananas domesticated in the Pacific region
Maoli-Popo'ulu subgroup - subgroup of cooking bananas domesticated in the Pacific region
Maqueño banana
Popoulu banana
Mysore subgroup - cooking and dessert bananas
Mysore banana
Pisang Raja subgroup
Pisang Raja banana
Plantain subgroup
French plantain
Cooking banana
Green French banana
Horn plantain & Rhino Horn banana
Nendran banana
Pink French banana
Tiger banana
Pome subgroup
Pome banana
Prata-anã banana (Dwarf Brazilian banana, Dwarf Prata)
Silk subgroup
Latundan banana (Silk banana, Apple banana, Pisang Raja Sereh)
Others
Pisang Seribu banana
Plu banana

AABB Group
Tetraploid cultivars of Musa × paradisiaca

Kalamagol banana
Pisang Awak (Ducasse banana)

AB Group

Diploid cultivars of Musa × paradisiaca

Ney Poovan banana

ABB Group
Triploid cultivars of Musa × paradisiaca

Blue Java banana (Ice Cream banana, Ney mannan, Ash plantain, Pata hina, Dukuru, Vata)
Bluggoe Subgroup
Bluggoe banana (also known as orinoco and "burro")
Silver Bluggoe banana
Pelipita banana (Pelipia, Pilipia)
Saba Subgroup
Saba banana (Cardaba, Dippig)
Cardaba banana
Benedetta banana

ABBB Group
Tetraploid cultivars of Musa × paradisiaca

Tiparot banana

BB Group
Diploid Musa balbisiana, wild bananas

Callimusa section
Cultivars of Musa lolodensis, Musa maclayi and Musa peekelii belong in Musa section Callimusa.
Fe'i banana

See also

Lists of cultivars
Musa (genus)
True plantains

References

Further reading

External links
Information portal on banana cultivars

 
Lists of cultivars